The Kočerin Tablet is a medieval tablet with an inscription written in Bosnian Cyrillic, in an archaic West Stokavian dialect of Serbo-Croatian, using Ikavian pronunciation.

History and discovery
The stećak tombstone, which is placed on the grave of Viganj Milošević, was cut and inscribed in 1404 or 1405. In 1872, stećak was moved to Kočerin and built-in into the right side of the local parochial office wall. In May 2004, it was carefully removed from the office wall and exhibited in the parochial premises in Kočerin.

Dimensions
It measures  in height. The top part is damaged.

Text
The tablet contains 25 rows of script, with 9-15 characters on each line. There are 300 characters in total and represents the largest known text in Bosnian Cyrillic. 

The text displays a large number of ligatures. It is written in a Shtokavian Ikavian dialect, without nasal vowels, in a single-yer script, with some apparent Glagolitic influence. The form svetago shows influence from Church Slavonic, but the rest of the inscription is free of Church Slavonicisms in its morphology.

The text mentions how Viganj Milošević served five rulers: Banus Stjepan, King Tvrtko, King Dabiša, Queen Gruba, and King Ostoja. The inscription ends by saying: .

References

External links

Texts of medieval Bosnia and Herzegovina
1404 works
15th-century inscriptions
Written monuments of Bosnia and Herzegovina
Bosnian Cyrillic texts
Široki Brijeg